Events in the year 1969 in Brazil.

Incumbents

Federal government
President: 
 (until 31 August) Marshal Artur da Costa e Silva 
 (from 31 August to 30 October, de jure) Pedro Aleixo
 (from 31 August to 30 October, de facto) Admiral Augusto Rademaker, General Aurélio de Lira Tavares and General Márcio Melo 
 (starting 30 October) General Emílio Garrastazu Médici 
Vice President: 
 (until 31 August) Pedro Aleixo 
 (from 31 August to October) vacant 
 (starting October) General Augusto Rademaker

Governors 
 Acre: vacant
 Alagoas: Antônio Simeão de Lamenha Filho 
 Amazonas: Danilo Duarte de Matos Areosa
 Bahia: Luís Viana Filho 
 Ceará: Plácido Castelo
 Espírito Santo: Cristiano Dias Lopes Filho 
 Goiás: Otávio Lage
 Guanabara: Francisco Negrão de Lima 
 Maranhão: Jose Sarney 
 Mato Grosso: Pedro Pedrossian 
 Minas Gerais: Israel Pinheiro da Silva 
 Pará: Alacid Nunes 
 Paraíba: João Agripino Maia 
 Paraná: Pablo Cruz Pimentel 
 Pernambuco: Nilo Coelho
 Piauí: Helvídio Nunes
 Rio de Janeiro: Geremias de Mattos Fontes
 Rio Grande do Norte: Walfredo Gurgel Dantas 
 Rio Grande do Sul: Walter Peracchi Barcelos 
 Santa Catarina: Ivo Silveira 
 São Paulo: Roberto Costa de Abreu Sodré 
 Sergipe: Lourival Baptista

Vice governors
 Alagoas: Manoel Sampaio Luz 
 Amazonas: Rui Arajuo (until 26 July); vacant thereafter (from 26 July) 
 Bahia: Jutahy Magalhães 
 Ceará: Humberto Ellery
 Espírito Santo: Isaac Lopes Rubim 
 Goiás: Osires Teixeira 
 Maranhão: Antonio Jorge Dino
 Mato Grosso: Lenine de Campos Póvoas 
 Minas Gerais: Pio Soares Canedo 
 Pará: João Renato Franco 
 Paraíba: Antônio Juarez Farias 
 Paraná: Plínio Franco Ferreira da Costa 
 Pernambuco: Salviano Machado Filho 
 Piauí: João Clímaco d'Almeida 
 Rio de Janeiro: Heli Ribeiro Gomes
 Rio Grande do Norte: Clóvis Motta
 Santa Catarina: Jorge Bornhausen 
 São Paulo: Hilário Torloni 
 Sergipe: vacant

Events
31 August to 30 October – Brazilian Military Junta of 1969 rules the country following sudden illness and resignation of President da Costa e Silva. The junta consists of Army General Aurélio de Lyra Tavares, Navy Admiral Augusto Hamann Rademaker Grunewald and Air Force Brigadier Márcio de Souza e Mello
November 19 November - Playing for Santos against Vasco in Rio de Janeiro, Brazilian footballer Pelé scored his 1,000th goal.

Births
 30 April – Paulo Jr., bassist
 30 June – Dira Paes, actress
 25 July – David Brazil, promoter
 18 September – Gralak, footballer
 26 September – Dan Stulbach, actor, television presenter, director and artistic director
 11 November – Bismarck Barreto Faria, footballer
 5 December – Jean Elias, footballer

Deaths
 12 March – Adhemar de Barros, politician
 10 July – João de Souza Mendes, chess master
 6 September – Arthur Friedenreich, soccer player, regarded by some as the sport's first outstanding black player
 4 November – Carlos Marighella, Marxist revolutionary and writer
 7 November – Cyro de Freitas Valle, lawyer
 17 December – Artur da Costa e Silva, former President, heart attack

References

See also 
1969 in Brazilian football
1969 in Brazilian television

 
1960s in Brazil
Years of the 20th century in Brazil
Brazil
Brazil